Eleni Kordolaimi (born 7 March 1993) is a Greek tennis player.

Career
Kordolaimi has a career-high WTA rankings of 435 in singles, achieved on 10 December 2018, and 344 in doubles, set on 16 July 2018. She has won five singles titles and ten doubles titles on the ITF Circuit.

Playing for Greece Fed Cup team, Kordolaimi has a win–loss record of 3–2.

ITF finals

Singles: 10 (5–5)

Doubles: 24 (11–13)

External links
 
 
 

1993 births
Living people
Greek female tennis players
Place of birth missing (living people)
Sportspeople from Lamia (city)